Días de ilusión is a 1980 Argentine film directed by Fernando Ayala. It is based on a short story Mamá de niebla by Poldy Bird.

Cast
  Andrea Del Boca
  Luisina Brando
  Fernando Siro
  Hilda Bernard
  Alita Román
  Nya Quesada

References

External links
 
 Días de ilusión on AllMovie

1980 films
Argentine drama films
Films directed by Fernando Ayala
1980s Spanish-language films
1980 drama films